The 2014 IPP Open and the Orto-Lääkärit Open were professional tennis tournaments played on indoor hard courts. It was the 14th edition of the men's tournament which was part of the 2014 ATP Challenger Tour, offering a total of €42,500 in prize money, and seventh edition of the women's tournament, which was part of the 2014 ITF Women's Circuit, offering a total of $10,000 in prize money. The two events took place together at the Tali Tennis Center in Helsinki, Finland, on 10–16 November 2014.

Men's entrants

Seeds 

 1 Rankings as of 3 November 2014

Other entrants 
The following players received wildcards into the singles main draw:
  Henri Laaksonen
  Micke Kontinen
  Juho Paukku
  Jürgen Zopp

The following players received entry from the qualifying draw:
  Philipp Davydenko
  Maxim Dubarenco
  Patrik Rosenholm
  Elias Ymer

The following player received entry into the singles main draw as a lucky loser:
  Egor Gerasimov

Women's entrants

Seeds 

 1 Rankings as of 3 November 2014

Other entrants 
The following players received wildcards into the singles main draw:
  Valeria Gorlats
  Ella Leivo
  Nanette Nylund
  Olivia Pimiä

The following players received entry from the qualifying draw:
  Jacqueline Cabaj Awad
  Šarlota Česneková
  Anastasia Kulikova
  Antonina Lysakova
  Anastasia Nefedova
  Polina Novoselova
  Rebecca Poikajärvi
  Roosa Timonen

The following player received entry into the singles main draw as a lucky loser:
  Hélène Scholsen

Champions

Men's singles 

  Jürgen Zopp def.  Dudi Sela, 6–4, 5–7, 7–6(8–6)

Women's singles 

  Amy Bowtell def.  Tess Sugnaux, 6–2, 6–3

Men's doubles 

  Henri Kontinen /  Jarkko Nieminen def.  Jonathan Marray /  Philipp Petzschner, 7–6(7–2), 6–4

Women's doubles 

  Emma Laine /  Eugeniya Pashkova def.  Mia Nicole Eklund /  Olivia Pimiä, 6–4, 6–0

External links 
 

2014
2014 ATP Challenger Tour
Orto-Laakarit Open